Sim is the third album by Brazilian singer-songwriter Vanessa da Mata, released on May 28, 2007, by Sony BMG. It was partially recorded at Kingston, Jamaica with musicians Sly & Robbie. It spawned the hit single "Boa Sorte/Good Luck", a duet with Ben Harper, which peaked at number one in both Brazil and Portugal, and was the most played song in Brazilian radio stations in the year of 2008. The second single, "Amado", also became a number-one hit in Brazil and the 15th most played song in the same year.

Track listing
 "Vermelho" (Vanessa Da Mata) – 3:44
 "Fugiu Com A Novela" (Vanessa Da Mata) – 3:16
 "Baú" (Vanessa Da Mata) – 4:25
 "Boa Sorte / Good Luck" (Featuring Ben Harper) (Vanessa Da Mata/Ben Harper) – 3:55
 "Amado" (Vanessa Da Mata/Marcelo Joneci) – 4:11
 "Pirraça" (Vanessa Da Mata/Kassin) – 3:25
 "Você Vai Me Destruir" (Vanessa Da Mata Et Fernando Catatau) – 4:31
 "Absurdo" (Vanessa Da Mata) – 3:27
 "Quem Irá Nos Proteger?" (Vanessa Da Mata) – 3:50
 "Ilegais" (Vanessa Da Mata) – 3:51
 "Quando Um Homem Tem Uma Mangueira No Quintal" (Vanessa Da Mata) – 2:13
 "Meu Deus" (Vanessa Da Mata) – 4:56
 "Minha Herança: Uma Flor" (Vanessa Da Mata) – 3:33

Charts

Year-end charts

References

External links
 

2007 albums
Vanessa da Mata albums